The cryptomonads-haptophytes assemblage is a proposed but disputed monophyletic grouping of unicellular eukaryotes that are not included in the SAR supergroup. Several alternative names have been used for the group, including Hacrobia (derived from "ha-" referring to Haptophyta, "-cr-" referring to cryptomonads, and "-bia" as a general suffix referring to life); CCTH (standing for Cryptophyta, Centrohelida, Telonemia and Haptophyta); and "Eukaryomonadae".

, it is unclear whether this group is monophyletic or not; results of phylogenetic studies are "often dependent on the selection of taxa and gene data set". Two 2012 studies produced opposite results.

Members

In the past, heterokonts, haptophytes, and cryptomonads have sometimes been  grouped together in a group known as chromists. Though the heterokonts are now split out, Cryptophyta and Haptophyta are considered in some studies to be closely related (and are sometimes simply referred to as the "Cryptophyta+Haptophyta" group). A 2009 paper suggested that the Telonemia and centrohelids may form a clade with the cryptophytes and haptophytes.  The picobiliphytes may belong in this group but are too poorly known to be classified with confidence.

Several recent studies have concluded that Haptophyta and Cryptophyta do not form a monophyletic group. The former are a sister group to the SAR group, the latter cluster with the Archaeplastida (plants in the broad sense). , it remains unclear whether the Hacrobia forms a monophyletic group.

Another study suggested the following arrangement: centrohelids are related to haptophytes and form the clade Haptista; Haptista is the sister group to SAR; Cryptista are related to Archaeplastida; and Haptista + SAR is the sister clade to Cryptista + Archaeplastida.

Phylogeny
Based on work done by Silar 2016.

References

External links

 Tree of Life: Hacrobia

 
Subkingdoms